Long Valley is a former settlement in Lassen County, California.

A post office operated at Long Valley from 1869 to 1912, when it was moved to Constantia, moving also in 1898.

References

Former settlements in Lassen County, California
Former populated places in California